The 1989 Norwich Union Grand Prix was a professional invitational snooker tournament, which took place between 20 May and 12 November 1989.

The tournament comprised four qualifying rounds, which took place in Strasbourg, Lyon, Paris and Brussels, with the winner of each going through to the semi-finals of the final tournament held in Monte Carlo, Monaco. Joe Johnson won the tournament beating Stephen Hendry 5–3 in the final.

Main draw

References

Norwich Union Grand Prix
Norwich Union Grand Prix
Norwich Union Grand Prix
Norwich Union Grand Prix